The men's freestyle middleweight was a freestyle wrestling event held as part of the Wrestling at the 1928 Summer Olympics programme. It was the fourth appearance of the event. Middleweight was the third-heaviest category, including wrestlers weighing up to 79 kilograms.

Results
Source: Official results; Wudarski

Gold medal round

Silver medal round

1 Stockton was declared the winner after Hammonds retired from the match due to injury.

Bronze medal round

As Hammonds and Praeg were both unable to compete after being injured in the silver medal round, Samuel Rabin was awarded the bronze medal.

References

Wrestling at the 1928 Summer Olympics